Stevie at the Beach is the fourth studio album by American singer-songwriter Stevie Wonder released on the Tamla (Motown) label on June 23, 1964. With the exception of the mild hit, "Hey Harmonica Man", it was a concept album of sorts, focusing on beach and surfer anthems as an attempt to get Wonder to now sing surf tunes. However, much like the label's attempts to first make him the teenage version of Ray Charles and then for one album as a lounge singer, it failed to connect with audiences. Wonder would not have another hit until 1965 when he was finally allowed to showcase his musical talents more.

Track listing

Side one
"Castles in the Sand" (Hal Davis, Marc Gordon, Mary O'Brien, Frank Wilson) - 2:11
"Ebb Tide" (instrumental) (Robert Maxwell, Carl Sigman) - 1:45
"Sad Boy" (Dorsey Burnette, Gerald Nelson) - 2:28
"Red Sails in the Sunset" (instrumental) (Hugh Williams, Jimmy Kennedy) - 2:01
"The Beachcomber" (instrumental) (Arthur Wright) - 1:46
"Castles in the Sand" (instrumental) (Hal Davis, Marc Gordon, Mary O'Brien, Frank Wilson) - 1:52
Side two
"Happy Street" (George Everette Hemric, Jule Styne) - 2:19
"The Party at the Beach House" (Frank Wilson) - 2:03
"Hey Harmonica Man" (Marty Cooper, Lou Josie) - 2:38
"Beachstomp" (Hal Davis, Frank Wilson) - 2:38
"Beyond the Sea" (Charles Trenet, Jack Lawrence) - 2:46

Personnel
 Stevie Wonder - vocals, harmonica, possible bongos, drums and keyboards
 Various Los Angeles session musicians - instrumentation
 Uncredited - background singers

References

Stevie Wonder albums
1964 albums
Tamla Records albums
Albums produced by Hal Davis
Albums recorded at Hitsville U.S.A.
Concept albums